David Gordon Scott is a British criminologist, abolitionist and author. He is a criminologist at The Open University in Milton Keynes.

Scott's research interests span the field of criminology, particularly focusing on socialist ethics, abolitionism, social harm, liberative justice, harms of capitalist states, and state-corporate harm.

Scott is the Co-Founding Editor of the Journal Justice, Power and Resistance.  He is also known for his contributions in documentaries including Punishment: A Failed Social Experiment and the BBC Ideas Viewpoint – What Would A World Without Prisons Be Like?

Early life and education
Scott received a B.A. honors degree in Applied Social Science in 1994 and a post-graduate master's degree in Crime, Deviance and Social Policy in 1996 from Lancaster University. Later, in 2006, he completed his PhD under the supervision of Barbara Hudson from the University of Central Lancashire, and his thesis was titled Ghosts beyond our realm: A neo-abolitionist analysis of prisoner human rights and prison office culture He has also earned a certificate in Adult Education teaching from City and Guilds and became a Fellow of higher education academy.

Career
Scott joined Edge Hill College of Higher Education as a Temporary Lecturer in Criminology and held an appointment as a lecturer of sociology at the New College of Further and Higher Education in Durham from 1996 till 1998. Afterwards, he was appointed as a lecturer in criminology at the University of Northumbria. He was then promoted to a Senior Lecturer in Criminology in 2000 at the University of Central Lancashire, a position he held for 13 years.

During his work span at the University of Central Lancashire, Scott has served as an International Ambassador at the University of Geneva in Switzerland, Université de Savoie and the Catholic University of Lyon in France and the UCLan Cyprus Campus.

In 2009 he was appointed as an International coordinator of the European Group for the Study of Deviance and Social Control. Subsequently, in 2012 he held a brief appointment as a Coordinator of the Working Group on Prison, Detention and Punishment.  Afterwards, in 2014 he co-founded an independent academic publisher named EG Press and worked as a Director there until 2018. He is currently serving as the Chair of the ‘Weavers Uprising Bicentennial Remembrance Committee’.

Scott is the Co-Founding Editor of the Journal Justice, Power and Resistance.  He is also known for his contributions in documentaries including Punishment: A Failed Social Experiment and the BBC Ideas Viewpoint – What Would A World Without Prisons Be Like?

Research
Scott's research is focused in the field of criminology with a specific interest in the impacts of punishment and prison. He has authored books, book chapters, blogs and journal articles in this field.

Prison abolition 
Scott's broad research in investigating prisoners and their life in prison led him to identify behavioral aspects of prisoners and officers, legal rights and politics related to it. In his early research, he documented that the Human Rights Act (HRA) was not institutionalized in prisons as officers consider prisoners as ghosts-like and do not acknowledge their needs and sufferings. Later, he stated that in order to get a positive interaction with officers a prisoner must maintain the appropriate deference due to officer's superiority. He claimed that assessment of existing policies and the level of training available prior to its implementation and the reassuring messages sent to the staff via official discourse are the methods to identify the restricted interpretation of the Human Rights Act, and in April 2020 gave evidence in the only UK based case on the harms of COVID19 in prisons in the UK in a Report for the High Court of Justice (Queens Bench Division) Administrative Court for the case of R v Secretary of State (ex parte Davis).

Apart from officer-prisoner behavior and policies, Scott as a prison abolitionist has worked for the welfare of prisoners by highlighting the mundane misery prisoners suffer everyday. He described physical, cultural, and structural as three forms of violence that take place in prison and explained how this is directly related to suicidal ideation. He further maintained that anti-violence and harm reduction strategies such as Therapeutic Communities can be a radical alternative for certain people in certain circumstances. He subsequently argued that the ideology underscoring the case that prisoners’ rights are not of public interest or political concern is a punitive thought and should be challenged but that a human rights agenda should not be based on the likeability of those involved or making individuals sympathetic.

Penal abolition
Scott has also focused his research on penal abolition with a particular focus on its local and global perspective, something which is explored in detail in his co-edited book the International Handbook of Penal Abolition. He has talked about five different interventions that can aid penal abolitionists to have a democratic dialogue and also discussed the impacts of abolitionist theory with public participation and the importance of conceiving penal abolition as a future-oriented philosophy of hope, in a chapter of the book The Routledge Handbook of Public Criminologies. Later, in 2021, he described a retrospective on penal abolition as a language, intellectual and theoretical perspective, social movement, political strategy, set of ethico-political values, and revolutionary praxis. While setting out the practical possibilities of penal abolitionism and transformative justice he proposed that community-based interventions such as restorative justice are required and those who cause harm should be held accountable. He has referred to this as an ‘abolitionist real utopia’. He has recently returned to his early work on the relationship between penal abolition and the Christian prison chaplain and found tensions between carceral Christian theologies and abolitionist liberation theologies. This reflected some ideas to inform abolitionist theologies to Christian prison chaplaincy regarding penal abolition with respect to the socialist ethics of dignity, empathy, freedom, and paradigm of life while working against an unchristian institution. He makes similar arguments about socialist ethics, liberative justice and penal dehumanisation in his book For Abolition.

Bibliography

Books
Penology (2008) ISBN 978-1412948111
Controversial Issues in Prisons (2010) ISBN 978-0335223039
Prisons and Punishment: The Essentials (2014) ISBN 978-1446273470
Emancipatory Politics and Praxis: An Anthology of Essays written for the European Group for the Study of Deviance and Social Control (2016) ISBN 978-1911439011
Against Imprisonment: An Anthology of Abolitionist Essays (2018) ISBN 978-1909976542
For Abolition: Essays on Prisons and Socialist Ethics (2020) ISBN 978-1909976825

References

Criminology
British writers
British academics
Prison abolitionists
British criminologists
British sociologists
British human rights activists